The Leone, Florentine, and Carpathia Apartment Buildings are located at 832 and 834 South 24 Street and 907-911 South 25 Street in Omaha, Nebraska, USA. Built in 1909, the buildings were listed on the National Register of Historic Places in 1985.

References

National Register of Historic Places in Omaha, Nebraska
Apartment buildings in Omaha, Nebraska
Residential buildings completed in 1909
Residential buildings on the National Register of Historic Places in Nebraska